ZNF385D is a gene on chromosome 3 that encodes for the zinc finger protein 385, a zinc finger protein.  It has been implicated in dyslexia.

References 

Dyslexia